Army Welfare Trust (AWT), also known as Askari Group of Companies, is a Pakistani conglomerate company. It is based in Rawalpindi, Pakistan. The Army Welfare Trust, along with Fauji Foundation, are run by ex-military personnel of the Pakistan Army. The companies provide employment opportunities to ex-military personnel and generate funds for the welfare and rehabilitation of orphans, widows of the deceased soldiers, and the disabled personnel of the army.

History
It was established in 1971. The first commercial unit was a stud farm located in Probyanabad. AWT now has a total of 15 business units working under its banner.

Companies
It is one of the largest conglomerates in Pakistan. The assets the group owns are:

Listed on Stock exchange
 Askari General Insurance
 Askari Life Insurance

Unlisted
Following are the companies which are not listed on Pakistani stock exchanges:
 Askari Aviation
 Askari Bank
 Askari Cement
 Mobil Pakistan
 Askari Tower, Lahore
 AWT Investments
 Army Welfare Sugar Mills
 Blue Lagoon Rawalpindi
 Askari Guards
 Askari CNG
 Askari Enterprises 
 Askari Farms and Seeds
 Askari Real Estate
 Blue Lagoon, Faisalabad

See also
Fauji Foundation
Bahria Foundation
Shaheen Foundation
Defence Housing Authority

References

Conglomerate companies of Pakistan
Conglomerate companies established in 1971
1971 establishments in Pakistan
Companies based in Rawalpindi
Pakistan Army affiliated organizations